The 2006 FIFA World Cup qualification UEFA Group 2 was a UEFA qualifying group for the 2006 FIFA World Cup. The group comprised Albania, Denmark, Georgia, Greece, Kazakhstan, Turkey and Ukraine.

The group was won by Ukraine, who qualified for the 2006 FIFA World Cup. The runners-up Turkey entered the UEFA qualification play-offs.

It was the first time when Kazakhstan took part in qualification from UEFA region, not AFC.

Standings

Results

Goalscorers

7 goals

 Fatih Tekke

6 goals

 Jon Dahl Tomasson
 Andriy Shevchenko

5 goals

 Søren Larsen
 Giorgi Demetradze

4 goals

 Erjon Bogdani

3 goals

 Martin Jørgensen
 Malkhaz Asatiani
 Angelos Charisteas
 Stelios Giannakopoulos
 Tümer Metin
 Tuncay
 Andriy Husin
 Ruslan Rotan

2 goals

 Igli Tare
 Michael Gravgaard
 Claus Jensen
 Peter Møller
 Christian Poulsen
 Alexander Iashvili
 Nihat Kahveci
 Oleksiy Byelik

1 goal

 Adrian Aliaj
 Alban Bushi
 Edwin Murati
 Florian Myrtaj
 Ervin Skela
 Daniel Agger
 Dennis Rommedahl
 Aleksandr Amisulashvili
 Vladimir Burduli
 Giorgi Gakhokidze
 Levan Kobiashvili
 Angelos Basinas
 Michalis Kapsis
 Giorgos Karagounis
 Kostas Katsouranis
 Nikos Liberopoulos
 Dimitris Papadopoulos
 Vassilios Tsiartas
 Zisis Vryzas
 Theodoros Zagorakis
 Ruslan Baltiev
 Andrei Karpovich
 Daniar Kenzhekhanov
 Aleksandr Kuchma
 Maksim Nizovtsev
 Maksim Zhalmagambetov
 Halil Altıntop
 Necati Ateş
 Koray Avcı
 Yıldıray Baştürk
 Okan Buruk
 Gökdeniz Karadeniz
 Tolga Seyhan
 İbrahim Toraman
 Oleh Husyev
 Andriy Rusol
 Andriy Voronin

1 own goal

 Igor Avdeev (playing against Ukraine)

References

See also 

2
2004–05 in Ukrainian football
qual
2004–05 in Albanian football
2005–06 in Albanian football
2004–05 in Turkish football
2005–06 in Turkish football
2004–05 in Greek football
2005–06 in Greek football
2004–05 in Danish football
2005–06 in Danish football
2004–05 in Georgian football
2005–06 in Georgian football
2004 in Kazakhstani football
2005 in Kazakhstani football